Rahway is a city in southern Union County, in the U.S. state of New Jersey. A bedroom community of New York City, it is centrally located in the Rahway Valley region, in the New York metropolitan area.

Built on the navigable Rahway River, it was an industrial and artisanal craft city for much of its history. The city has increasingly reinvented itself in recent years as a diverse regional hub for the arts.

As of the 2020 United States census, the city's population was 29,556, an increase of 2,210 (+8.1%) from the 2010 census count of 27,346, which in turn reflected an increase of 846 (+3.2%) from the 26,500 counted in the 2000 census.

History

Indigenous presence
Rahway and the surrounding area were once the home of the Lenni Lenape Native Americans, and tradition states that the city was named after Rahwack (or Ra-wa-rah), a local tribal chief.

English colonization
Formal European colonization began in 1664 with the purchase by the English from the Lenape of the Elizabethtown Tract, which encompassed lands from the mouth of the Raritan River and included all of present-day Union County as well as parts of Somerset, Middlesex, Morris and Essex counties. The early settlers of Elizabethtown and Woodbridge were the founders of Rahway which began as outlying acreage and plantations. The Seventeenth Century Clark House is one of the oldest buildings in the state.

By the 18th century, Rahway consisted of four distinct communities: Upper Rahway, Bridge Town, or Lower Rahway, Leesville, and Milton.

Revolutionary War and the Battle of Spanktown
Rahway saw action during the American Revolutionary War because of its proximity to Staten Island, Elizabethtown and Perth Amboy. In January 1777, rebels were victorious against the British in the Battle of Spanktown, which resulted in the death of some 100 British troops. The battle was named this after Rahway's original name given to it by the first settlers, Spanktown, which is said to have been chosen "because an early settler publicly took his spouse across his knee and chastised her". Spanktown was mentioned in Revolutionary War military dispatches from January 5, 1777, through March 14, 1782.

The Merchants' and Drovers' Tavern is located at the corner of St. Georges and Westfield Avenues.  The earliest buildings at the site date to 1795 and the property remains one of Rahway's most prominent historical landmarks. George Washington visited Rahway during his travel to New York City prior to his presidential inauguration in 1789.  A marker across the street from the tavern reads:

Here, on April 23, 1789, on his way to New York City, Washington was received by troops from Elizabethtown and Newark. He was entertained at the inn kept by Samuel Smith by gentlemen of the town.

Following the Revolution, Rahway became the home of the first national mint to create a coin bearing the inscription E pluribus unum. A United States Post Office established in Rahway was one of only six in the entire state in 1791.

Various historical place markers in town document Rahway Revolutionary War history.

Stagecoach era and corporate growth

Rahway grew due to its location along the major stagecoach and railroad lines between New York City and Philadelphia, Pennsylvania. The navigable Rahway River, which flows through the city, also aided the city's commercial growth.

As immigrants from Britain, Ireland and Germany streamed into what was then Rahway Township in the 1850s, Rahway became incorporated as a city by an act of the State Legislature on April 19, 1858, from portions of Rahway Township in Union and Woodbridge Township in Middlesex County. In 1860, the portion of Rahway that had been part of Middlesex County was transferred to Union. On March 13, 1861, the remainder of Rahway Township became part of Rahway City. Clark Township was formed from portions of the city on March 23, 1864.

The first municipal elections for the mayor and council were conducted on April 19, 1858, and the council held its first meeting on May 3, 1858. The city's police department and its initial group of four constables were created at that first council meeting.

The city became home to dozens of major manufacturers, including the Regina Music Box Company, Wheatena, Mershon Bros. and, most importantly, Merck & Co., which was established in Rahway in 1903, when George W. Merck moved his small chemical company to Rahway from New York City.

Postwar era
The national decline in industry after World War II led to the closure of most of Rahway's major manufacturing facilities (except for Merck) and a general deterioration of the city's central business district.

Revitalization

Beginning in the late 1990s, the city launched a plan to revitalize the downtown area and authorized the construction of hundreds of new market-rate housing units, a hotel, art galleries and additional retail space.

Geography
According to the United States Census Bureau, the city had a total area of 4.04 square miles (10.47 km2), including 3.90 square miles (10.09 km2) of land and 0.15 square miles (0.38 km2) of water (3.59%).

Rahway is bordered by the municipalities of Clark to the northwest and Linden to the northeast in Union County; and by Woodbridge Township to the south in Middlesex County.

The Rahway River travels through Rahway, entering from Clark at Rahway River Parkway.  The river receives the waters of Robinsons Branch at Elizabeth Avenue between West Grand Avenue and West Main Street, and then receives the waters of the South Branch at East Hazlewood Avenue and Leesville Avenue. The river leaves Rahway at the city limits of Linden and Woodbridge before flowing into the Arthur Kill.

Unincorporated communities, localities and place names located partially or completely within the city include Inman Heights and North Rahway.

Climate
The climate in this area is characterized by hot, humid summers and generally mild to cool winters. According to the Köppen Climate Classification system, Rahway has a humid subtropical climate, abbreviated "Cfa" on climate maps.

Demographics

2010 census

The Census Bureau's 2006–2010 American Community Survey showed that (in 2010 inflation-adjusted dollars) median household income was $58,551 (with a margin of error of +/− $3,355) and the median family income was $77,268 (+/− $9,506). Males had a median income of $56,572 (+/− $3,375) versus $47,832 (+/− $3,542) for females. The per capita income for the city was $28,855 (+/− $1,981). About 5.4% of families and 8.7% of the population were below the poverty line, including 10.9% of those under age 18 and 9.4% of those age 65 or over.

2000 census
As of the 2000 United States census there were 26,500 people, 10,028 households, and 6,728 families residing in the city. The population density was 6,642.7 people per square mile (2,564.3/km2). There were 10,381 housing units at an average density of 2,602.2 per square mile (1,004.5/km2). The racial makeup of the city was 60.19% White, 27.07% African American, 0.16% Native American, 3.58% Asian, 0.05% Pacific Islander, 5.62% from other races, and 3.33% from two or more races. Hispanic or Latino people of any race were 13.87% of the population.

There were 10,028 households, out of which 30.0% had children under the age of 18 living with them, 46.7% were married couples living together, 15.6% had a female householder with no husband present, and 32.9% were non-families. 28.0% of all households were made up of individuals, and 11.7% had someone living alone who was 65 years of age or older. The average household size was 2.63 and the average family size was 3.24.

In the city the population was spread out, with 23.9% under the age of 18, 7.8% from 18 to 24, 32.0% from 25 to 44, 21.8% from 45 to 64, and 14.5% who were 65 years of age or older. The median age was 37 years. For every 100 females, there were 91.2 males. For every 100 females age 18 and over, there were 86.5 males.

The median income for a household in the city was $50,729, and the median income for a family was $61,931. Males had a median income of $41,047 versus $32,091 for females. The per capita income for the city was $22,481. About 5.4% of families and 7.1% of the population were below the poverty line, including 9.3% of those under age 18 and 8.2% of those age 65 or over.

Economy

Downtown

In 2020, downtown Rahway received accolades as a Great Downtown by the American Planning Association: "Downtown Rahway is a great place. It is a place that emphasizes livability, walkability, shopping, food, art, diversity and a destination. Centered in the heart of the bustling City of Rahway, next to the NJ Transit Station, Rahway's downtown is the building block for this diverse city."

In 2019, the Watt Hotel opened across from the train station, with 100 rooms managed by Hilton on the third and fourth floors of a 17-story building, a lobby cocktail lounge and a rooftop terrace with a seasonal bar offering views of the city, river and outwards to the Watchung Mountains.

Beginning in the early 1990s and continuing through the present day, the City of Rahway has rebounded as its downtown began to see the construction of new restaurants, art galleries, market-rate housing and the old Rahway Theatre reopening as the Union County Performing Arts Center. The theater underwent a $6.2-million renovation and expansion project, completed in 2007. As part of the expansion, the facility was purchased by the County of Union for $1.3 million and leased back for $1 a year.

Robert Wood Johnson University Hospital, Rahway
Robert Wood Johnson University Hospital, Rahway, formerly Rahway Hospital, is a 122-bed non-profit, public, research and academic teaching hospital located in Rahway. The medical center is a part of the RWJBarnabas Health System. It is affiliated with the Robert Wood Johnson Medical School. It also has an emergency department for area residents.

Merck & Co.
In 2021, Merck & Co. announced that it would be returning its global headquarters to its Rahway research campus (currently the largest private employer in Rahway) and former headquarters.  By 2023, Merck had completed its move of headquarters to Rahway.

Arts and culture

Local news media

Our Town Rahway is a free monthly community newspaper mailed out to residents and published by Renna Media.
TAPInto Rahway is a local news site covering Rahway news exclusively, part of the TAPinto network of news in Central and Northern New Jersey.
Rahway Rising is a longstanding news site run by the former editor of the now-defunct newspaper The Rahway Progress and covering city council meetings with a focus on redevelopment.
Union News Daily.  A news outlet covering Union County news, it has a dedicated Rahway section. It is part of LocalSource and published by Worrall Community Newspapers of Union.
Remaining multi-community newspapers that cover Rahway include the Courier News, a daily newspaper based in Bridgewater Township, and The Star-Ledger and the Suburban News based in Newark.

Library and other media

In September 1999, remnants of Hurricane Floyd swept across New Jersey and caused severe damage.  The Rahway Public Library was on a flood plain and suffered over US$1 million in flood damage.  The building was demolished in October 2001 and a new library was constructed and opened on March 22, 2004, behind the city's municipal building along a less flood-prone area of the Rahway River. The area where the former Rahway Public Library was now contains tennis courts and a small playground.

Historian and Rahway native Eva Bridges opened the city's Black-owned bookstore, Bridges Book Center Afro-American Research Library & Museum, located at 1480 Main Street, in 1970.

Performing and visual arts

As of the early 2020s, downtown Rahway has become a regional hub in the performing and visual arts.  In 2021, Rahway was named the #2 Best Small Town Arts Scene in the country by USA Today.

The landmarked Rahway Theatre building is home to the Union County Performing Arts Center.

Houses of worship

 The First Presbyterian Church of Rahway was established in 1741 and its current church on Grand and Church Street was built in 1832.  It was extensively remodeled in 1876.
 Divine Mercy Parish is a Roman Catholic community of faith in Rahway. Its church on Central Avenue was built in 1888 by Irish architect Jeremiah O'Rourke. It was formerly known as St. Mary's Roman Catholic Church, which was merged by the Archdiocese with the former St. Mark's German Catholic Church around 2010 to form Divine Mercy Parish.
 Built in 1865, the Seventh-day Adventist Church stands at the intersection of Main Street and West Emerson (1221 New Brunswick Avenue). It was formerly the Second Presbyterian, but that congregation merged with the First Presbyterian in 2012.
 Established in 1826, the Ebenezer AME Church in Rahway is one of the oldest African Methodist Episcopal church in the country
 Trinity Methodist. Founded in 1849, this Methodist group was called Second Methodist. In 1893, the group changed its name to Trinity United Methodist and built the large brick, Romanesque-styled church on the corner of E. Milton Avenue and Main Street.

Parks and recreation

City parks
The city is home to more than ten parks.  The best-known is Rahway River Park, which is maintained by Union County, and is also partially located in Clark. The Robinson's Branch Reservoir abuts the city at the Madison Hill Bridge on the Clark-Rahway border.

The pool at Rahway River Park
The Walter E. Ulrich swimming pool in Rahway River Park was extensively renovated and retiled in 2021. A beach-style splash feature for children, with an "ocean-like" sloping entry without stairs, was added to the pool that year. The pool is available to Union County residents and their guests for a daily fee.
Built in 1929, it was documented by the Historic American Engineering Record in 1985.

Government

Local government
The City of Rahway is governed under the Faulkner Act system of municipal government under the Mayor-Council (Plan F), implemented as of January 1, 1955, based on the recommendations of a Charter Study Commission. The township is one of 71 municipalities (of the 564) statewide that use this form of government. The city's governing body is comprised of the Mayor and the nine-member City Council. The Mayor is elected directly by the voters. The City Council is comprised of nine members, all elected to four-year terms of office. Six members of the council are elected from each of six wards. The other three members are elected to represent the entire city on an at-large basis. Elections are in even-numbered years, with the six ward seats up together, followed two years later by the three at-large seats and the mayoral seat. Under the City of Rahway's form of government, all executive and administrative authority is vested in the office of the mayor, who appoints the Business Administrator and department directors. The Business Administrator develops an annual budget for the city, manages the city's departments and oversees its employees. This form of government gives citizens a centralized line of authority for the efficient management of the city's business.

, the mayor of Rahway is Democrat Raymond A. Giacobbe Jr., whose term of office ends December 31, 2026. The members of the Municipal Council are Jeffrey Brooks (At Large; D, 2026), David Brown (Fourth Ward; D, 2024), Michael W. Cox (Second Ward; D, 2024), Joseph D. Gibilisco (Sixth Ward; D, 2024), Joanna Miles (At Large; D, 2026), Jeremy E. Mojica (At Large; D, 2026), Danielle "Danni" Newbury (Fifth Ward; D, 2024), Al Parker (First Ward; D, 2024) and Vannie Deloris Parson (Third Ward; D, 2024)..

In January 2022, Jeffrey Brooks was appointed from a list of three candidates nominated by the Democratic municipal committee to the fill the at-large seat expiring in December 2022 that had been held by James E. Baker until he stepped down from office to take a seat on the Union County Board of County Commissioners.

Federal, state, and county representation

Rahway is located in the 7th Congressional District and is part of New Jersey's 22nd state legislative district.

 

Union County is governed by a Board of County Commissioners, whose nine members are elected at-large to three-year terms of office on a staggered basis with three seats coming up for election each year, with an appointed County Manager overseeing the day-to-day operations of the county. At an annual reorganization meeting held in the beginning of January, the board selects a Chair and Vice Chair from among its members. , Union County's County Commissioners are 
Chair Rebecca Williams (D, Plainfield, term as commissioner and as chair ends December 31, 2022), 
Vice Chair Christopher Hudak (D, Linden, term as commissioner ends 2023; term as vice chair ends 2022),
James E. Baker Jr. (D, Rahway, 2024),
Angela R. Garretson (D, Hillside, 2023),
Sergio Granados (D, Elizabeth, 2022),
Bette Jane Kowalski (D, Cranford, 2022), 
Lourdes M. Leon (D, Elizabeth, 2023),
Alexander Mirabella (D, Fanwood, 2024) and 
Kimberly Palmieri-Mouded (D, Westfield, 2024).
Constitutional officers elected on a countywide basis are
County Clerk Joanne Rajoppi (D, Union Township, 2025),
Sheriff Peter Corvelli (D, Kenilworth, 2023) and
Surrogate Susan Dinardo (acting).
The County Manager is Edward Oatman.

Politics
As of March 2011, there were a total of 15,719 registered voters in Rahway, of whom 7,159 (45.5% vs. 41.8% countywide) were registered as Democrats, 1,675 (10.7% vs. 15.3%) were registered as Republicans and 6,880 (43.8% vs. 42.9%) were registered as Unaffiliated. There were 5 voters registered as Libertarians or Greens. Among the city's 2010 Census population, 57.5% (vs. 53.3% in Union County) were registered to vote, including 73.5% of those ages 18 and over (vs. 70.6% countywide).

In the 2012 presidential election, Democrat Barack Obama received 8,413 votes (74.7% vs. 66.0% countywide), ahead of Republican Mitt Romney with 2,648 votes (23.5% vs. 32.3%) and other candidates with 107 votes (0.9% vs. 0.8%), among the 11,269 ballots cast by the city's 16,730 registered voters, for a turnout of 67.4% (vs. 68.8% in Union County). In the 2008 presidential election, Democrat Barack Obama received 8,340 votes (69.8% vs. 63.1% countywide), ahead of Republican John McCain with 3,410 votes (28.5% vs. 35.2%) and other candidates with 115 votes (1.0% vs. 0.9%), among the 11,944 ballots cast by the city's 16,039 registered voters, for a turnout of 74.5% (vs. 74.7% in Union County). In the 2004 presidential election, Democrat John Kerry received 6,512 votes (63.1% vs. 58.3% countywide), ahead of Republican George W. Bush with 3,668 votes (35.5% vs. 40.3%) and other candidates with 92 votes (0.9% vs. 0.7%), among the 10,326 ballots cast by the city's 14,471 registered voters, for a turnout of 71.4% (vs. 72.3% in the whole county).

In the 2013 gubernatorial election, Democrat Barbara Buono received 55.4% of the vote (3,211 cast), ahead of Republican Chris Christie with 43.0% (2,494 votes), and other candidates with 1.6% (93 votes), among the 5,934 ballots cast by the city's 16,359 registered voters (136 ballots were spoiled), for a turnout of 36.3%. In the 2009 gubernatorial election, Democrat Jon Corzine received 3,961 ballots cast (57.4% vs. 50.6% countywide), ahead of Republican Chris Christie with 2,451 votes (35.5% vs. 41.7%), Independent Chris Daggett with 366 votes (5.3% vs. 5.9%) and other candidates with 68 votes (1.0% vs. 0.8%), among the 6,895 ballots cast by the city's 15,842 registered voters, yielding a 43.5% turnout (vs. 46.5% in the county).

Education
The Rahway Public Schools serve students in pre-kindergarten through twelfth grade. As of the 2020–21 school year, the district, comprised of six schools, had an enrollment of 4,056 students and 325.5 classroom teachers (on an FTE basis), for a student–teacher ratio of 12.5:1. Schools in the district (with 2020–21 enrollment data from the National Center for Education Statistics) are 
Grover Cleveland Elementary School with 513 students in grades PreK-6, 
Franklin Elementary School with 618 students in grades PreK-6, 
Madison Elementary School with 341 students in grades PreK-6, 
Roosevelt Elementary School with 578 students in grades PreK-6, 
Rahway 7th & 8th Grade Academy with 730 students in grades 7-8 and 
Rahway High School with 1,124 students in grades 9-12.

Trivia

Marquis de Lafayette

From July 1824 to September 1825, the French Marquis de Lafayette, the last surviving major general of the American Revolutionary War, made a tour of the 24 states in the United States, stopping at the Peace Tavern in Rahway.

Nikola Tesla

In the 1880s, Nikola Tesla opened Tesla Electric Light & Manufacturing in Rahway.

Legends of pirate treasure
According to recently resurfaced 19th century lore, Captain William Kidd buried treasure in the Rahway area, alongside the body of one of his men he had just murdered.

The location of this pirate treasure was said to be on the southern banks of the Rahway River at a spot called Price's or Post's Woods, said to be midway between Rahway and the Arthur Kill.

The murder and burial of treasure was witnessed secretly from a tree, allegedly, by a Lenape chieftain known as Ra-wa-rah who is the namesake of the city of Rahway. Ra-wa-rah allegedly witnessed the murder and burial of treasure while returning from a fishing journey.

East Jersey State Prison

East Jersey State Prison, formerly known as Rahway State Prison, actually is located in Woodbridge Township at the border with Rahway. The prison's mailing address is in Rahway, leading many to believe the facility was located there. The prison's official name was changed to East Jersey State Prison as of November 30, 1988, at the request of the citizens of Rahway. East Jersey State Prison is seen at the beginning of the movie Ocean's Eleven, starring George Clooney. The 1978 documentary Scared Straight was filmed there, as was the 1989 movie Lock Up, starring Sylvester Stallone. The prison was briefly mentioned in John Sayles City of Hope (1991).

The Unknown Woman
The Rahway murder of 1887 was the unsolved murder of an unidentified young woman whose body was found in the city on March 25, 1887, garnering attention from the press and the public.

Transportation

Roads and highways

Rahway is served by U.S. Route 1/9, Route 27, and Route 35. The city is sandwiched between the Garden State Parkway and the New Jersey Turnpike, which are each located about two miles outside of the city limits.
There are several crossings of the Rahway River in the city.

Public transportation
NJ Transit 115 route provides local service and interstate service to and from the Port Authority Bus Terminal in Midtown Manhattan, with service on the 48 line to Elizabeth and Perth Amboy.

Rahway Train Station serves NJ Transit's North Jersey Coast Line and Northeast Corridor Line. The City of Rahway and NJ Transit helped fund a $16 million renovation for the station in 1999 and a public plaza in front of the station was completed in 2001, changes that have spurred cleanup and revitalization downtown.  A new US$11.2 million 524-space parking deck opened across the street from the station in January 2005, helping train commuters and allowing the city to transform old parking lot space into new buildings and residences. A typical train ride to New York City's Pennsylvania Station takes 38 minutes.

Airport

Notable people

People who were born in, residents of, or otherwise closely associated with Rahway include:

 Antonio Alfano, American football defensive tackle for the Colorado Buffaloes
 Juliette Atkinson (1873–1944), Hall of Fame tennis player and three-time U.S. Open champion
 Robert Lee Bloomfield (1827–1916), businessman and church-founder
 Peter Boettke (born 1960), economist of the Austrian School
 Frank E. Boland (–1913), James Paul Boland (1882–1970) and Joseph John Boland (1879–1964), early aircraft designers who started the Boland Airplane and Motor Company
 Aaron Bradshaw, basketball player.
 Kimberly Brandão (born 1984), professional women's soccer player; captain of the Portugal Women's National Team, which she has represented since 2007
 Chris Brantley (born 1970), former NFL wide receiver; played for the Los Angeles Rams and Buffalo Bills
 Ronald Breslow (born 1931), chemist
 Isaac Brokaw (1746–1826), clockmaker
 Harvey Brown (1795–1874), military officer who fought in the Black Hawk and Seminole Wars, the Mexican–American War and the American Civil War
 James Monroe Buckley (1836–1920), Methodist minister, doctor, author and editor of the Christian Advocate.
 Darrion Caldwell (born 1987), mixed martial artist competing for Bellator MMA
 Louis Campbell (born 1979), professional basketball player; plays for Strasbourg IG of the French League
 Clifford P. Case (1904–1982), Representative of the Sixth District of New Jersey in the House of Representatives (1945–1954); United States Senator (R-NJ) 1955–1979
 Abraham Clark (1725–1794), signer of the Declaration of Independence; buried at the Rahway Cemetery
 Earl Clark (born 1988), professional basketball player who played in the NBA for the Brooklyn Nets
 Samuel Hanson Cox (1793–1880), Presbyterian minister and abolitionist
 Mary Frances Creighton (1899–1936), housewife, who along with Everett Applegate, was executed in Sing Sing prison's electric chair, Old Sparky, for the poisoning of Applegate's wife
 Joseph T. Crowell (1817–1891), Speaker of the New Jersey General Assembly and President of the New Jersey Senate
 Arnold D'Ambrosa (born 1933), politician who served in the New Jersey General Assembly from 1974 to 1976, until his career was cut short by a political scandal
 George Davenport (1783–1845), frontiersman, trader, United States Army officer and settler in the Iowa Territory; namesake of Davenport, Iowa
 Dion Dawkins (born 1994), offensive tackle for the Buffalo Bills of the NFL
 Evie (born 1956), contemporary Christian music singer
 John Frazee (1790–1862), sculptor and architect
 Amos Noë Freeman (1809–1893), abolitionist, educator and Presbyterian minister
 Milton Friedman (1912–2006), economist and Nobel Prize winner
 Leighton Gage (1942–2013), author of crime fiction
 Antonio Garay (born 1979), defensive tackle for the San Diego Chargers
 Wayne Gilchrest (born 1946), U.S. Congressman
 Alfred M. Gray Jr. (born 1928), 29th Commandant of the Marine Corps, from July 1, 1987, to June 30, 1991
 Jerome Kagan (1929–2021), professor emeritus of psychology at Harvard University; one of the pioneers of developmental psychology
 Janis Karpinski (born 1953), one of the first women Brigadier Generals of the Army; former commander of the Abu Ghraib Prison in Iraq
 William H. Lash (1961–2006), Assistant Secretary of Commerce for Market Access and Compliance 2001–2005
 Paul Matey (born 1971), attorney who is a United States circuit judge of the United States Court of Appeals for the Third Circuit
 Benjamin Fay Mills (1857–1916), evangelist preacher, vegetarianism activist and writer
 Richard Moran (born 1950), investor, venture capitalist, author and president emeritus of Menlo College
 Ira Nadel (born 1943), biographer, literary critic and James Joyce scholar
 Olsen Pierre (born 1991), American football defensive end who played in the NFL for the Arizona Cardinals
 Dory Previn (1925–2012, born as Dorothy Veronica Langan), lyricist and singer-songwriter
 Pearl Reaves (1929–2000), R&B singer and guitarist
 Eric Roberson (born 1976), R&B and soul singer-songwriter
 Freddie Russo (1924–1987), professional boxer
 Carl Sagan (1934–1996), astronomer; winner of Pulitzer Prize for General Non-Fiction Writing in 1978
 Mike Seamon (born 1988), soccer midfielder who has played for the Seattle Sounders FC and the Pittsburgh Riverhounds
 Mark Slonaker (born 1957), college basketball coach; head coach of the Mercer Bears men's basketball team 1998–2008
 Chris Smith (born 1953), U.S. Congressman
 Dexter Strickland (born 1990), McDonald's High School All-American basketball player; attended the University of North Carolina at Chapel Hill
 Kurt Sutter (born 1966), screenwriter, director, producer and actor
 Nikola Tesla (1856–1943), formed his company, Tesla Electric Light & Manufacturing, in Rahway
 Marques Townes (born 1995), basketball player for the Loyola Ramblers men's basketball team, who transferred out of Cardinal McCarrick after his sophomore year
 Kevin M. Tucker (1940–2012), Commissioner of the Philadelphia Police Department, 1986–1988
 Allan Vache (born 1953), jazz clarinetist; younger brother of Warren Vache
 Warren Vache (born 1951), jazz cornetist and veteran of the groups of Benny Goodman, Rosemary Clooney, Benny Carter, Annie Ross and many other jazz notables
 Dr. P. Roy Vagelos (born 1929), retired Merck & Co. CEO
 Carolyn Wells (1862–1942), author and poet
 Shanice Williams (born 1996), actress who starred as Dorothy in The Wiz Live! on NBC in December 2015
 Emmanuel Yarbrough (1964–2015), 1995 USA World Sumo Champion
 Robert Rahway Zakanitch (born 1935), painter and a founder of the Pattern and Decoration movement

References

External links

 Official municipal website
 Rahway Center Partnership

 
1858 establishments in New Jersey
Cities in Union County, New Jersey
Faulkner Act (mayor–council)
Populated places established in 1858